Wild pomegranate is a common name for several plants and may refer to:

 Burchellia
 Capparis canescens
 Punica granatum